Pete or Peter Petersen may refer to:

Peter Petersen (footballer) (born 1981), South African footballer
Peter Christian Petersen (1791–1853), Norwegian naval officer
Peter Petersen (sport shooter) (1892–1964), Danish sports shooter
Robert E. Petersen (1926–2007), American publisher, known as Pete
Pete Petersen (politician) (born 1950), American politician
Peter J. K. Petersen (1821–1896), Norwegian businessperson
Peter Arnoldus Petersen (1851–1916), Norwegian businessperson
Peter Petersen (born 1767) (1767–1850), Norwegian mining engineer, ironworks manager and politician
Peter Petersen (musicologist) (born 1940), German musicologist
Peter Petersen (actor), stage-name for Max Paulsen (1876–1956), Austrian actor in The Eternal Mask

See also
Ole Peter Petersen (1822–1901), founder of Methodism in Norway
Peter Peterson (disambiguation)
Peter Pedersen (disambiguation)